Cecilia Álvarez-Correa Glen (born 30 August 1953) is an Industrial Engineer and Colombian politician who served as Minister of Commerce, Industry and Tourism of Colombia under President Juan Manuel Santos Calderón. Álvarez-Correa is credited as the second woman to hold this post in Colombian history. Previously, Álvarez-Correa served as the 12th Minister of Transport of Colombia.

Career
On 28 August 2012 President Juan Manuel Santos Calderón announced his decision to appoint Álvarez-Correa as Minister of Transport of Colombia. She was sworn in on 3 September at a ceremony at the Palace of Nariño. On August 11, 2014, Álvarez-Correa assumed the role of Minister of Commerce, Industry and Tourism of Colombia.

Personal life
Cecilia was born on 30 August 1953 in Ciénaga, Magdalena, the youngest of eight children to the Sephardic Jewish descent-family of Jaime Álvarez-Correa Díaz-Granados and María de Lourdes Glen Ruiz.

She recently made public her personal relationship with the Minister of Education Gina Parody.

References

1953 births
Living people
Ministers of Transport of Colombia
People from Magdalena Department
Colombian people of Jewish descent
Pontifical Xavierian University alumni
Colombian industrial engineers
Women government ministers of Colombia
Colombian Sephardi Jews
Spanish and Portuguese Jews
Lesbian Jews
Colombian LGBT politicians
Lesbian politicians
Ministers of Commerce, Industry and Tourism of Colombia
21st-century Colombian women politicians
21st-century Colombian politicians
LGBT government ministers
21st-century LGBT people